Bernabé Zapata Miralles (born 12 January 1997) is a Spanish tennis player. He has a career high ATP singles ranking of World No. 42 achieved on 27 February 2023. He also has a career high ATP doubles ranking of World No. 503 achieved on 4 February 2019.

Professional career

2018: ATP debut
Zapata Miralles made his ATP main draw debut at the 2018 Geneva Open after qualifying for the singles main draw and he had his first main draw win by defeating Florian Mayer in straight sets.

2020-21: Maiden  Challenger title, Top 125 & Major debut & first win
He won his maiden title at the 2020 Internazionali di Tennis del Friuli Venezia Giulia in Cordenons, Italy defeating Carlos Alcaraz.

He had his second ATP main draw win when he beat John Millman in the first round of 2021 Dubai Tennis Championships in straight sets.

On his Grand Slam debut he qualified for his first at the 2021 French Open, and then for his second Major at the 2021 Wimbledon Championships.

Zapata Miralles was the champion in the Challengers in Heilbronn and Poznań claiming his first and second ATP Challenger titles of 2021. As a result, he achieved a new career high ranking of world No. 110 on 2 August 2021.

He subsequently qualified for his third Major in a row at the 2021 US Open as lucky loser. He reached the second round for the first time in his career defeating fellow Spaniard Feliciano López.

2022: Grand Slam fourth round & first top-15 win, top 75 debut
Ranked No. 130 at the 2022 French Open, Zapata Miralles qualified to make his second consecutive Grand Slam main draw at this Major. He won his first match at this Major defeating wildcard Michael Mmoh. In the second round he recorded a career breakthrough, upsetting World No. 14 and 13th seed Taylor Fritz for his maiden third-round showing at a Grand Slam and first top-15 win. He went one step further to reach the fourth round, having never past the second round of a Major before, defeating John Isner in a five set  hours match. He was the first Spanish qualifier to reach the fourth round of a Grand Slam since recording started in 1983. As a result, he secured a top 100 debut at world No. 97 on 6 June 2022 and two weeks later he reached No. 90.
Following his title at the 2022 Meerbusch Challenger he reached a career-high ranking of No. 74 on 15 August 2022.

2023: First Two ATP career semifinals at the Latin American Golden Swing & Top 50
At the ATP 250 2023 Córdoba Open he broke the record for the longest match ever in the tournament history when he defeated compatriot Roberto Carballes Baena in three hours and 26 minutes in the first round. The previous-longest match was in 2020, when Albert Ramos-Vinolas outlasted Pablo Andujar in three hours and 20 minutes.

At the next ATP 250 2023 Argentina Open he reached the semifinals for the first time in his career defeating two seeds, fourth seed, home favorite, Argentine Diego Schwartzman in the second round  and fifth seed, another Argentine Francisco Cerundolo in the quarterfinals but lost to top seed compatriot Carlos Alcaraz. As a result he reached a new career high ranking of world No. 63 on 20 February 2023.

He reached back to back semifinals in the Golden Swing at the ATP 500 2023 Rio Open defeating two seeds again, fourth seed Francisco Cerundolo again and seventh seed Albert Ramos-Vinolas. He lost to second seed Cameron Norrie. As a result he moved another 20 positions in the top 45 at world No. 42 on 27 February 2023.

Performance timelines

Singles

Current through the 2022 Basel.

ATP Challenger and ITF Futures finals

Singles: 18 (12–6)

Doubles: 3 (1–2)

Record against top 10 players
Zapata Miralles's record against players who have been ranked in the top 10, with those who are active in boldface. Only ATP Tour main draw matches are considered:

Notes

References

External links

 
 

1997 births
Living people
Spanish male tennis players
Sportspeople from Valencia
Tennis players from the Valencian Community